Tamynaikos Football Club is a Greek football club, based in Aliveri, Euboea, Greece

Honours

Domestic

  Euboea FCA Champion: 3
 1979–80, 1991–92, 2016–17
  Euboea FCA  Cup Winners: 3
 1977–78, 1994–95, 2007–08

References

Euboea
Association football clubs established in 1958
1958 establishments in Greece
Gamma Ethniki clubs